Edward R. Stone was an Olympian swimmer and diver who later became an educator.

Athletic career
Ed swam the backstroke, butterfly and crawl for the U.S. Olympic team during the 1948 Summer Olympics, making it to the finals.  

He also held three world records in diving.

Later life
He was employed as a master at The Hill School as well as a teacher at The Kimberton Waldorf School.  A graduate of the University of Michigan and Columbia University, he received his Waldorf School teaching credentials at Emerson College in England.

References

1920s births

Year of birth uncertain

2012 deaths

The Hill School faculty
University of Michigan alumni
Columbia University alumni